William Henty (born 23 September 1808 in West Tarring, Sussex, England). He moved to Tasmania in 1837 and for over 20 years practised as a solicitor. In 1857 he was elected a member of the legislative council for Tamar and was colonial secretary in the Weston cabinet. He held this office for five and a half years until his resignation in 1862.

He was also an Australian cricketer, who played two games for Tasmania in 1851. He has the distinction of having participated in the first ever first-class cricket match in Australia, and having bowled the first ever ball in a first class cricket match in Australia. He opened the bowling for Tasmania in both innings, bowling right arm underarm, and took 4/52, and 5/26 for 9/78 for the match.

He returned to England in 1862, where he remained until his death on 11 July 1881 in Hove, Sussex, England at the age of 72. He was survived by a daughter.

He was interested in Shakespeare and after his death a small volume by him, Shakespeare with some Notes on his early Biography, was printed for private circulation. This has little value but contains a memoir of the author by R. Harrison.

See also
 List of Tasmanian representative cricketers

References

1808 births
1881 deaths
Australian cricketers
Tasmania cricketers
People from Tarring, West Sussex
English emigrants to Australia
Members of the Tasmanian Legislative Council
19th-century Australian politicians